"City of David" is a biblical and religious epithet for the ancient city of Jerusalem.

It may also refer to:

 City of David (archaeological site) - an archaeological excavation associated with ancient Jerusalem
 Jerusalem Walls National Park - a tourist development related to the archaeological site
 Wadi Hilweh - an area of Silwan and its modern history